Donjeta Sadiku (born 8 July 1999) is a Kosovan boxer. She competed for Kosovo at the 2020 Summer Olympics in the women's lightweight event and has previously competed for the country at the 2019 European Games.
Her coach is Marjola Sallauka

Biography
Donjeta Sadiku was born on 8 July 1999 in Pristina, Kosovo. She began boxing at the age of 12,  in Pristina.
Her coach is Marjola Sallauka

Career

2018 Women's European Amateur Boxing Championships
Her first senior competition were the 2018 Women's European Amateur Boxing Championships in Sofia, Bulgaria. She received a bye into the round of 16 where she faced Polish Aneta Rygielska, finishing with a 05 loss by points.

2018 AIBA Women's World Boxing Championships
In November 2018, Sadiku was set to compete in the lightweight competition at the 2018 AIBA Women's World Boxing Championships in New Delhi, India. She was denied a visa to enter the country due to India's lack of recognition of Kosovo. India was issued a warning by the International Boxing Association (AIBA) that if the decision was not reversed, the association would withdraw the 2021 AIBA World Boxing Championships from the country, originally scheduled to take place in New Delhi. Sadiku ultimately did not appear on the draw list published on 14 November 2018, and did not compete. This was her second boxing championship event impacted by a denial of entry into India, following a similar incident prior to the 2017 AIBA Youth Women's World Boxing Championships in Guwahati.

2019 European Games
At the 2019 European Games in Minsk, Belarus, Sadiku was chosen as Kosovo's flag bearer for the opening ceremony. She participated in the Women's 60 kg boxing event, seeding against the Danish Ditte Frostholm in the round of 32. Sadiku lost the match by points, finishing 05.

2020 Summer Olympics
At the 2020 European Boxing Olympic Qualification Tournament in London and Villebon-sur-Yvette, Sadiku competed in the Women's lightweight tournament. In the round of 32, she matched up against German Maya Kleinhans winning the match by points 32, advancing to the round of 16 where she fought Swedish Agnes Alexiusson, falling short 23.

On 15 June 2021, Sadiku received an invitation from the Tripartite Commission to compete in the women's lightweight boxing event for Kosovo at the 2020 Summer Olympics, which was postponed a year due to the COVID-19 pandemic. In the round of 32, she faced British Caroline Dubois; Sadiku was eliminated, losing by decision 05.

References

External links
 

Living people
1999 births
Sportspeople from Pristina
Kosovan boxers
Boxers at the 2020 Summer Olympics
Kosovo Albanians
Lightweight boxers
Boxers at the 2019 European Games
Olympic boxers of Kosovo
European Games competitors for Kosovo